Fernando Olmedo Reguera O.F.M.Cap. (10 January 1873 – 12 August 1936), also known as Fernando of Santiago, was a Catholic priest and victim of the Spanish Civil War. At the outbreak of war in 1936, Reguera was forced to leave his convent and was arrested, imprisoned and beaten by Republican forces. Refusing to reveal penitents' confessions, he was then tried by a popular tribunal and sentenced to death. He was executed by firing squad. On 13 October 2013, Fernando was beatified by Pope Francis during a ceremony in Tarragona.

Life
Fernando Olmedo Reguera was born in Santiago de Compostela, La Coruña.

Following his calling to the faith, he joined the Order of Friars Minor Capuchin, an off-shoot of the Franciscan order, being ordained on the July 31, 1904. At the outbreak of the Spanish Civil War, Reguera was serving as the order's provincial secretary, however like many others, he was forced to go into hiding. During this time, he attempted to continue his ministry, however, he was apprehended just three weeks after the war began. In prison, he was subjected to numerous beatings, however, he refused to break the seal of the confessional. He was then tried and executed at the Montaña barracks outside Madrid His remains are entombed at the Church of Jesus of Medinaceli in Madrid.

Beatification
On 27 March 2013, Fernando Olmedo Reguera was venerated as a martyr and beatified by Pope Francis during a ceremony in Tarragona.

See also
Seal of the Confessional in the Catholic Church
Martyrs of the Spanish Civil War

References

Martyrs of the Spanish Civil War
Beatifications by Pope Francis
Confession (Catholic Church)
Martyred Roman Catholic priests
Priest–penitent privilege
Spanish beatified people
1873 births
1936 deaths